HMS Swallow was a 60-gun fourth rate ship of the line of the Royal Navy, built by Peirson Lock to the dimensions of the 1719 Establishment at the Yard at Plymouth Dock (now called Devonport), and launched on 6 October 1732. She was renamed HMS Princess Louisa in 1737.

Engagements
HMS Princess Louisa took part in the destruction of the fortress of San Lorenzo el Real Chagres (22-24 March 1740), in Panama, as part of a squadron commanded by Vice-Admiral Edward Vernon during the War of Jenkins' Ear.

Given the overwhelming superiority of the English forces, Captain Don Juan Carlos Gutiérrez Cevallos surrendered the fort on 24 March, after resisting for two days.

Princess Louisa served until 1742, when she was broken up.

Notes

References

Lavery, Brian (2003) The Ship of the Line - Volume 1: The development of the battlefleet 1650-1850. Conway Maritime Press. .

Ships of the line of the Royal Navy
1730s ships